Foil–Cline House, also known as the John A. Foil House, is a historic home located at Newton, Catawba County, North Carolina. It was built in 1883, and is a two-story, "L"-shaped, Italianate style frame dwelling. It features a multi-gabled roof has a widely overhanging boxed and molded cornice supported by thick curvilinear brackets and porch with overhanging bracketed eaves.

It was listed on the National Register of Historic Places in 1990.

References

Houses on the National Register of Historic Places in North Carolina
Houses completed in 1883
Italianate architecture in North Carolina
Houses in Catawba County, North Carolina
National Register of Historic Places in Catawba County, North Carolina